Earth has a human population of over 8 billion as of 2023, with an overall population density of 50 people per km2 (130 per sq. mile), excluding Antarctica. Nearly 60% of the world's population lives in Asia, with almost 2.8 billion in the countries of China and India combined. The percentage shares of India, China and rest of South Asia of the world population have remained at similar levels for the last few thousand years of recorded history. The world's literacy rate has increased dramatically in the last 40 years, from 66.7% in 1979 to 86.3% today. Lower literacy levels are mostly attributable to poverty. Lower literacy rates are found mostly in South Asia and Sub-Saharan Africa. The world's largest ethnic group is Han Chinese, constituting over 19% of the global population in 2011.
In terms of the largest number of native speakers, Mandarin is the world's most spoken language.

The world's population is predominantly urban and suburban, and there has been significant migration toward cities and urban centres. The urban population jumped from 29% in 1950 to 55.3% in 2018. Interpolating from the United Nations prediction that the world will be 51.3 percent urban by 2010, Ron Wimberley, Libby Morris and Gregory Fulkerson estimated 23 May 2007 would have been the first time the urban population outnumbered the rural population in history. China and India are the most populous countries, as the birth rate has consistently dropped in wealthy countries and until recently remained high in poorer countries. Tokyo is the largest urban agglomeration in the world.

As of 2021, the total fertility rate of the world is estimated at 2.32 children per woman, which is slightly below the global average for the replacement fertility rate of approximately 2.33 (as of 2003), which would mean the world's population is declining. However, world population growth is unevenly distributed, with the total fertility rate ranging from one of the world's lowest 0.83 in Singapore, to the highest, 6.49 in Niger. The United Nations estimated an annual population increase of 1.14% for the year of 2000.
The current world population growth is approximately 1.09%. People under 15 years of age made up over a quarter of the world population (25.18%), and people age 65 and over made up nearly ten percent (9.69%) in 2021.

The world population more than tripled during the 20th century from about 1.65 billion in 1900 to 5.97 billion in 1999. It reached the 2 billion mark in 1927, the 3 billion mark in 1960, 4 billion in 1974, and 5 billion in 1987. The overall population of the world is approximately 8 billion as of November 2022. Currently, population growth is fastest among low wealth, least developed countries. The UN projects a world population of 9.15 billion in 2050, a 32.7% increase from 6.89 billion in 2010.

History 

Historical migration of human populations begins with the movement of Homo erectus out of Africa across Eurasia about a million years ago. Homo sapiens appear to have occupied all of Africa about 300,000 years ago, moved out of Africa 50,000 – 60,000 years ago, and had spread across Australia, Asia and Europe by 30,000 years BC. Migration to the Americas took place 20,000 to 15,000 years ago, and by 2,000 years ago, most of the Pacific Islands were colonized.

Until c. 10,000 years ago, humans lived as hunter-gatherers. They generally lived in small nomadic groups known as band societies. The advent of agriculture prompted the Neolithic Revolution, when access to food surplus led to the formation of permanent human settlements. About 6,000 years ago, the first proto-states developed in Mesopotamia, Egypt's Nile Valley and the Indus Valley. Early human settlements were dependent on proximity to water and, depending on the lifestyle, other natural resources used for subsistence. But humans have a great capacity for altering their habitats by means of technology.

Since 1800, the human population has increased from one billion to nearly eight billion, In 2004, some 2.5 billion out of 6.3 billion people (39.7%) lived in urban areas. In February 2008, the U.N. estimated that half the world's population would live in urban areas by the end of the year. Problems for humans living in cities include various forms of pollution and crime, especially in inner city and suburban slums. Both overall population numbers and the proportion residing in cities are expected to increase significantly in the coming decades.

World Population, AD 1–1998 (in thousands)
Source: Maddison and others. (University of Groningen).

Shares of world population, AD 1–1998 (% of world total)
Source: Maddison and others. (University of Groningen).

Historical vital statistics 
The following estimates of global trends in various demographic indicators from 1950 to 2021 are from UN DESA's World Population Prospects 2022. In July 2022, UN DESA published its 2022 World Population Prospects, a biennially-updated database where key demographic indicators are estimated and projected worldwide and on the country and regional level.

Notable events in World demography:
 1958-'61 - Great Chinese Famine
 1989 - Fall of the Berlin Wall, Revolutions of 1989
 2020-'22 - COVID-19

Current world population and latest projection

2019 population distribution

Major cities
The world has hundreds of major cities, mostly in coastal regions.

, the world had 159 metropolitan areas with a population of over 3,000,000 people each.

, about 3 billion people live in or around urban areas.

The following table shows the populations of the top ten conglomerations.

Population density 

Therefore, the worldwide human population density is 8 billion ÷  = .

Several of the most densely populated territories in the world are city-states, microstates or dependencies. These territories share a relatively small area and a high urbanization level, with an economically specialized city population drawing also on rural resources outside the area, illustrating the difference between high population density and overpopulation.

Religion 

The table below lists religions classified by philosophy; however, religious philosophy is not always the determining factor in local practice. Please note that this table includes heterodox movements as adherents to their larger philosophical category, although this may be disputed by others within that category. For example, Cao Đài is listed because it claims to be a separate category from Buddhism, while Hòa Hảo is not, even though they are similar new religious movements.

The population numbers below are computed by a combination of census reports, random surveys (in countries where religion data is not collected in census, for example United States or France), and self-reported attendance numbers, but results can vary widely depending on the way questions are phrased, the definitions of religion used and the bias of the agencies or organizations conducting the survey. Informal or unorganized religions are especially difficult to count. Some organizations may wildly inflate their numbers.

Since the late 19th century, the demographics of religion have changed a great deal. Some countries with a historically large Christian population have experienced a significant decline in the numbers of professed active Christians: see demographics of atheism. Symptoms of the decline in active participation in Christian religious life include declining recruitment for the priesthood and monastic life, as well as diminishing attendance at church. On the other hand, since the 19th century, large areas of sub-Saharan Africa have been converted to Christianity, and this area of the world has the highest population growth rate. In the realm of Western civilization, there has been an increase in the number of people who identify themselves as secular humanists.  Despite the decline, Christianity remains the dominant religion in the Western world, where 70% of the population is Christian. In many countries, such as the People's Republic of China, communist governments have discouraged religion, making it difficult to count the actual number of believers. However, after the collapse of communism in numerous countries of Eastern Europe and the former Soviet Union, religious life has been experiencing resurgence there, in the form of traditional Eastern Christianity. While, Islam however has gained considerably in the Soviet Unions former republics in Central Asia.

Following is some available data based on the work of the World Christian Encyclopedia:

Studies conducted by the Pew Research Center have found that, generally, poorer nations had a larger proportion of citizens who found religion to be very important than richer nations, with the exceptions of the United States and Kuwait.

Marriage
The average age of marriage varies greatly from country to country and has varied through time. Women tend to marry earlier than men and currently varies from 17.6 for women in Niger, to 32.4 for women in Denmark while men range from 22.6 in Mozambique to 35.1 in Sweden.

In 2021, 13.3 million babies, or about 10 per cent of the total worldwide, were born to mothers under 20 years old.

Age structure 

According to the 2021 CIA World Factbook, around 25% of the world's population is below 15 years of age.
 0–14 years: 25.2% (male 1,010,373,278/female 946,624,579)
 15–64 years: 65.1% (male 2,562,946,384/female 2,498,562,457)
 65 years and over: 9.7% (male 337,244,947/female 415,884,753) (2021 est.)
 Median Age – 31 years (male: 30.3 years, female: 31.8 years, 2021 est.)

According to a report by the Global Social Change Research Project, worldwide, the percent of the population age 0–14 declined from 34% in 1950 to 27% in 2010. The elderly population (60+) increased during the same period from 8% to 11%.

Population growth rate 

Globally, the growth rate of the human population has been declining since peaking in 1962 and 1963 at 2.20% per annum. In 2009, the estimated annual growth rate was 1.1%. The CIA World Factbook gives the world annual birthrate, mortality rate, and growth rate as 1.915%, 0.812%, and 1.092% respectively The last one hundred years have seen a rapid increase in population due to medical advances and massive increase in agricultural productivity made possible by the Green Revolution.

The actual annual growth in the number of humans fell from its peak of 88.0 million in 1989, to a low of 73.9 million in 2003, after which it rose again to 75.2 million in 2006. Since then, annual growth has declined. In 2009, the human population increased by 74.6 million, which is projected to fall steadily to about 41 million per annum in 2050, at which time the population will have increased to about 9.2 billion. Each region of the globe has seen great reductions in growth rate in recent decades, though growth rates remain above 2% in some countries of the Middle East and Sub-Saharan Africa, and also in South Asia, Southeast Asia, and Latin America.

Some countries experienced negative population growth, especially in Eastern Europe mainly due to low fertility rates, high death rates and emigration. In Southern Africa, growth is slowing due to the high number of HIV-related deaths. Some Western Europe countries might also encounter negative population growth. Japan's population began decreasing in 2005.

Population in the world increased from 1990 to 2008 with 1,423 billion and 27% growth. Measured by persons, the increase was highest in India (290 million) and China (192 million). Population growth was highest in Qatar (174%) and United Arab Emirates (140%).

In 2022 the world population reached the 8 billion. The latest projections by the United Nations suggest that the global population could grow to around 8.5 billion in 2030, 9.7 billion in 2050 and 10.4 billion in 2100.

More than half of the projected increase in global population up to 2050 will be concentrated in just eight
countries: Democratic Republic of the Congo, Egypt, Ethiopia, India, Nigeria, Pakistan, Philippines and Tanzania.

Birth count
Data required on total number of births per year, and distribution by country.

Birth rate

As of 2009, the average birth rate (unclear whether this is the weighted average rate per country [with each country getting a weight of 1], or the unweighted average of the entire world population) for the whole world is 19.95 per year per 1000 total population, a 0.48% decline from 2003's world birth rate of 20.43 per 1000 total population. 

According to the CIA – The World Factbook, the country with the highest birth rate currently is Niger at 51.26 births per 1000 people. The country with the lowest birth rate is Japan at 7.64 births per 1000 people. Hong Kong, a Special Administrative Region of China, is at 7.42 births per 1000 people. As compared to the 1950s, birth rate was at 36 births per 1000 in the 1950s, birth rate has declined by 16 births per 1000 people. In July 2011, the U.S. National Institutes of Health announced that the adolescent birth rate continues to decline.

Birth rates vary even within the same geographic areas. In Europe, as of July 2011, Ireland's birth rate is 16.5 percent, which is 3.5 percent higher than the next-ranked country, the UK. France has a birth rate of 12.8 per cent while Sweden is at 12.3 percent. In July 2011, the UK's Office for National Statistics (ONS) announced a 2.4% increase in live births in the UK in 2010 alone. This is the highest birth rate in the UK in 40 years. By contrast, the birth rate in Germany is only 8.3 per 1,000, which is so low that both the UK and France, which have significantly smaller populations, produced more births in 2010. Birth rates also vary within the same geographic area, based on different demographic groups. For example, in April 2011, the U.S. CDC announced that the birth rate for women over the age of 40 in the U.S. rose between 2007 and 2009, while it fell among every other age group during the same time span. In August 2011, Taiwan's government announced that its birth rate declined in the previous year, despite the fact that it implemented a host of approaches to encourage its citizens to have babies.

Birth rates ranging from 10 to 20 births per 1000 are considered low, while rates from 40 to 50 births per 1000 are considered high. There are problems associated with both an extremely high birth rate and an extremely low birth rate. High birth rates can cause stress on the government welfare and family programs to support a youthful population. Additional problems faced by a country with a high birth rate include educating a growing number of children, creating jobs for these children when they enter the workforce, and dealing with the environmental effects that a large population can produce. Low birth rates can put stress on the government to provide adequate senior welfare systems and also the stress on families to support the elders themselves. There will be less children or working age population to support the constantly growing aging population.

The ten countries with the highest and lowest crude birth rate, according to the 2018 and 2022 CIA World Factbook estimates, are:

Death rate 
The ten countries with the highest and lowest crude death rate, according to the 2018 and 2022 CIA World Factbook estimates, are:

See list of countries by mortality rate for worldwide statistics.

According to the World Health Organization, the 10 leading causes of death in 2002 were:

 12.6% Ischemic heart disease
 9.7% Cerebrovascular disease
 6.8% Lower respiratory infections
 4.9% HIV/AIDS
 4.8% Chronic obstructive pulmonary disease
 3.2% Diarrhoeal diseases
 2.7% Tuberculosis
 2.2% Trachea/bronchus/lung cancers
 2.2% Malaria
 2.1% Road traffic accidents

Causes of death vary greatly between first and third world countries.

According to Jean Ziegler (the United Nations Special Rapporteur on the Right to Food for 2000 to March 2008), mortality due to malnutrition accounted for 58% of the total mortality in 2006: "In the world, approximately 62 millions people, all causes of death combined, die each year. In 2006, more than 36 millions died of hunger or diseases due to deficiencies in micronutrients".

Of the roughly 150,000 people who died each day across the globe, about two-thirds—100,000 per day—died of age-related causes in 2001, according to an article which counts all deaths "due to causes that kill hardly anyone under the age of 40" as age-related. In industrialized nations, the proportion was even higher according to that article, reaching 90%.

Total fertility rate 

The Total fertility rate is the average number of children born per mother. In 2021, fertility levels high were found in sub-Saharan Africa (4.6  births per woman), Oceania excluding Australia and New Zealand (3.1), Northern Africa and Western Asia
(2.8), and Central and Southern Asia (2.3).

There is an inverse correlation between income and fertility, wherein developed countries usually have a much lower fertility rate. Various fertility factors may be involved, such as education and urbanization. Mortality rates are low, birth control is understood and easily accessible, and costs are often deemed very high because of education, clothing, feeding, and social amenities. With wealth, contraception becomes affordable. However, in countries like Iran where contraception was made artificially affordable before the economy accelerated, birth rate also rapidly declined. Further, longer periods of time spent getting higher education often mean women have children later in life. Female labor participation rate also has substantial negative impact on fertility. However, this effect is neutralized among Nordic or liberalist countries.

In undeveloped countries on the other hand, families desire children for their labour and as caregivers for their parents in old age. Fertility rates are also higher due to the lack of access to contraceptives, generally lower levels of female education, patriarchal culture and lower rates of female employment in industry.

Total fertility rates by region, 2010–2015
Total fertility rate is the number of children born per woman.

Health

The average number of hospital beds per 1,000 population is 2.94. It is highest in Switzerland (18.3) and lowest in Mexico (1.1)

96% of the urban population has access to improved drinking water, while only 78% of rural inhabitants have improved drinking water. A total average of 87% of urban and rural have access to improved drinking water.

4% of the urban population does not have access to improved drinking water, leaving 22% of rural people without improved drinking water with a total world population of 13% not having access to drinking water.

76% of the urban population has access to sanitation facilities, while only 45% of the rural population has access. A total world average of 39% do not have access to sanitation facilities.

As of 2009, there are an estimated 33.3 million people living with HIV/AIDS, which is approximately 0.8% of the world population, and there have been an estimated 1.8 million deaths attributed to HIV/AIDS.

As of 2010, 925 million people are undernourished.

Life Expectancy at Birth:
 total population: 71.4 years
 male: 69.1 years
 female: 73.8 years (2015 est.)

Infant Mortality
 total: 41.61 deaths/1,000 live births
 male: 43.52 deaths/1,000 live births
 female: 39.55 deaths/1,000 live births (2011 est.)

Sex ratio 

The value for the entire world population is 1.02 males/female, with 1.07 at birth, 1.06 for those under 15, 1.02 for those between 15 and 64, and 0.78 for those over 65.

The Northern Mariana Islands have the highest female ratio with 0.77 males per female. Qatar has the highest male ratio, with 2.87 males/female. For the group aged below 15, Sierra Leone has the highest female ratio with 0.96 males/female, and Georgia and China are tied for the highest male ratio with 1.13 males/female (according to the 2006 CIA World Factbook).

The "First World" G7 members all have a gender ratio in the range of 0.95–0.98 for the total population, of 1.05–1.07 at birth, of 1.05–1.06 for the group below 15, of 1.00–1.04 for the group aged 15–64, and of 0.70–0.75 for those over 65.

Countries on the Arabian Peninsula tend to have a "natural" ratio of about 1.05 at birth but a very high ratio of males for those over 65 (Saudi Arabia 1.13, United Arab Emirates 2.73, Qatar 2.84), indicating either an above-average mortality rate for females or a below-average mortality for males, or, more likely in this case, a large population of aging male guest workers. Conversely, countries of Eastern Europe (the Baltic states, Belarus, Ukraine, Russia) tend to have a "normal" ratio at birth but a very low ratio of males among those over 65 (Russia 0.46, Latvia 0.48, Ukraine 0.52); similarly, Armenia has a far above average male ratio at birth (1.17), and a below-average male ratio above 65 (0.67). This effect may be caused by emigration and higher male mortality as result of higher post-Soviet era deaths; it may also be related to the enormous (by western standards) rate of alcoholism in the former Soviet states. Another possible contributory factor is an aging population, with a higher than normal proportion of relatively elderly people: we recall that due to higher differential mortality rates the ratio of males to females reduces for each year of age.

Unemployment rate
8.7% (2010 est.)
8.2% (2009 est.)
note: 30% combined unemployment and underemployment in many non-industrialized countries; developed countries typically 4%–12% unemployment (2007 est.)

Languages 

Worldwide, English is used widely as a lingua franca and can be seen to be the dominant language at this time. The world's largest language by native speakers is Mandarin Chinese which is a first language of around 960 million people, or 12.44% of the population, predominantly in Greater China. Spanish is spoken by around 330 to 400 million people, predominantly in the Americas and Spain. Hindi is spoken by about 370 to 420 million speakers, mostly in India and Pakistan.

Arabic is spoken by around 350 million people predomimantly in Arab world. Bengali is spoken by around 250 million people worldwide, predominantly in Bangladesh and India. Portuguese is spoken by about 230 million speakers in Portugal, Brazil, East Timor, and Southern Africa.

There are numerous other languages, grouped into nine major families:

 Indo-European languages 46% (Europe, Western Asia, South Asia, North Asia, North America, South America, and Oceania)
 Sino-Tibetan languages 21% (East Asia, Mainland Southeast Asia, and South Asia)
 Niger–Congo languages 6.4% (Sub-Saharan Africa)
 Afroasiatic languages 6.0% (North Africa to Horn of Africa, and Western Asia)
 Austronesian languages 5.9% (Oceania, Madagascar, and Maritime Southeast Asia)
 Dravidian languages 3.7% (South Asia)
 Altaic languages (controversial combination of Turkic, Mongolic, and Tungusic families) 2.3% (Central Asia, North Asia (Siberia), and Anatolia)
 Austroasiatic languages 1.7% (Mainland Southeast Asia)
 Kra–Dai languages 1.3% (Southeast Asia)

There are also hundreds of non-verbal sign languages.

Education

Total population: 83.7% over the age of 15 can read and write, 88.3% male and 79.2% female
note: over two-thirds of the world's 793 million illiterate adults are found in only eight countries (Bangladesh, China, Egypt, Ethiopia, India, Indonesia, Nigeria, and Pakistan); of all the illiterate adults in the world, two-thirds are women; extremely low literacy rates are concentrated in three regions, the Arab states, South and West Asia, and Sub-Saharan Africa, where around one-third of the men and half of all women are illiterate (2005–09 est.)

As of 2008, the school life expectancy (primary to tertiary education) for a man or woman is 11 years.

See also

 Demographics of Africa
 Demographics of Antarctica
 Demographics of Asia
 Demographics of Europe
 Demographics of North America
 List of Caribbean countries by population
 Demographics of Oceania
 Demographics of South America
 World population

Notes

References

Demographics
World
Earth
Global culture